Roy Coxon is a former association football player who represented New Zealand at international level.

Coxon made his full All Whites debut in a 0–2 loss to New Caledonia on 19 September 1952 and ended his international playing career with eight A-international caps to his credit, scoring ten goals against Pacific nations. His final cap was an appearance in a 5–3 win over Tahiti on 28 September 1952.

References 

Year of birth missing (living people)
Living people
New Zealand association footballers
New Zealand international footballers
Association football forwards